"Take Me Back to Tulsa" is a Western swing standard song. Bob Wills and Tommy Duncan added words and music to the melody of the traditional fiddle tune "Walkin' Georgia Rose" in 1940. The song is one of eight country music performances selected for the Rock and Roll Hall of Fame's "500 Songs That Shaped Rock & Roll".

Song

"Take me Back to Tulsa" features one of Western Swing's greatest bands in full flight. It originated as a Bob Wills fiddle tune and was so popular at shows that Wills and singer Tommy Duncan added words and recorded it in early 1941. 

Musically, the song has been described as a "jubilant Western Swing romp", with Wills urging fiddler Louis Tireney to "turn it on boy, turn it on" half way through the song.

Wills's organization was based in Tulsa from 1934 to 1942, and the song takes its name from the chorus: "Take me back to Tulsa, I'm too young to marry". 

Lyrically, the song is a series of unrelated, mostly nonsense, rhyming couplets. One was:

The last quoted line was changed by 1946 by Wills to: "Little man raise the cotton, beer joints get the money." (Modern covers of the song have tended to use the line: "Poor boy picks the cotton, Rich man gets the money").

When Wills was asked about the lines, he said they were just nonsense lyrics that he learned as a youth. Though Wills did not know its origin, the couplet actually derives from a 19th century song of enslaved African Americans, a version of which also appeared in print in the 1880 novel My Southern Home by William Wells Brown.

When played at Cain's Ballroom in Tulsa and other venues, it often included the lines:

Bob Wills and The Texas Playboys recorded "Take Me Back to Tulsa" on February 26, 1941 at the Blackstone Hotel, Fort Worth, Texas (OKeh 6101) and it became one of their larger hits.  Bob Wills and His Texas Playboys previously performed the song in his 1940 movie Take Me Back to Oklahoma. Spade Cooley's Western Dance Gang also performed it in their 1944 short movie titled for the song, Take Me Back to Tulsa.

The song has been recorded by many other artists over the years.

Errata
Al Dexter is sometimes erroneously credited with writing "Take Me Back to Tulsa", perhaps due to his musically similar hit song "Pistol Packin' Mama".

Covers
Merle Haggard recorded a cover of the song for his 1970 album A Tribute to the Best Damn Fiddle Player in the World (or, My Salute to Bob Wills).

The country music group Asleep at the Wheel covered the song on their 1973 album Comin' Right at Ya.

George Strait did a cover of the song on his 2003 live album For the Last Time: Live from the Astrodome.

Red dirt (music) band Cross Canadian Ragweed performed a backstage cover of the song, released on their 2006 live album Back to Tulsa – Live and Loud at Cain's Ballroom.

Journey (band) frequently covered this song during the Raised on Radio Tour, replacing the word “Tulsa” with what city they were performing in at the time.

References

Bibliography
Carlin, Richard. Country Music: A Biographical Dictionary. Routledge, 2002. 
Coleman, Mark. Playback: From The Victrola To Mp3, 100 Years Of Music, Machines, And Money. Da Capo Press, 2004. 
Peterson, Richard A. "Class Unconsciousness in Country Music". You Wrote My Life: Lyrical Themes in Country Music'' pp. 35–62, edited by Melton A. McLaurin and Richard A. Peterson. Routledge, 1992. 

Western swing songs
1940 songs
Songs written by Bob Wills
Songs written by Tommy Duncan
Bob Wills songs
Songs about Tulsa, Oklahoma